Ways of Meaning is a full length vinyl, digital download and art edition album from Canadian composer Kyle Bobby Dunn. It was recorded at Bunce Cake studios in Brooklyn by the composer in 2010. The recordings are mostly quiet songs that are shorter in length from his earlier material and the 2010 release, A Young Person's Guide to Kyle Bobby Dunn. 
Interviews with the artist found that the songs were mainly recorded using guitar, laptop and organ as predominant sound sources - although touches of strings, choir, horns, and even electronic samples and textures are seemingly heard in certain songs. His music highly retains the spirit of contemporary classical composers like Arvo Pärt and like Pärt's music (usually just one or two very simple quiet lines of melody that either converge and crescendo to euphoric peaks, or just as easily end as plainly and hauntingly as they begin) there's an austere and meditative quality that is both oddly attractive and extremely powerful.

Critical Reaction

Delusions of Adequacy music journalist, Mark Lesseraux: 

New Artillery's Sebastian Stirling relished the album, writing: 

The Liminal wrote:

Ned Raggett, writing for the All Music Guide, stated:

Track listing
Side A
"Dropping Sandwiches (In Chester Lake)" - 3:54	
"Statuit" – 5:32
"Canyon Meadows" – 7:03
"New Pures" – 4:06

Side B
"Movement for the Completely Fucked" - 14:52
"Touhy's Theme" - 5:03

External links & reviews
 Review; "Anti-Gravity Bunny"
 Review; "The Milk Factory"
 Review; "Fluid Radio"
 Review; "ATTN Magazine"
 Review; "Cyclic Defrost"
 Review; "Textura"
 Review; "Muso's Guide
 Interview; Facts Raw at Fluid Radio
 Review; "The Death of CDs"
 Review; "Just Press Play"
 Review; "Middle Class White Noise"
 Review; "Textura"
 Review; "The Liminal"
 Review; "musicAddicted"
 Review; Brainwashed
 Review; One Thirty BPM
 Review; Huffington Post

References

2011 albums
Kyle Bobby Dunn albums